Jean-Philippe Grand (born 25 September 1953 in Chinon) is a French former racing driver.

References

1953 births
Living people
French racing drivers
International Formula 3000 drivers
24 Hours of Le Mans drivers
People from Chinon
Sportspeople from Indre-et-Loire

Graff Racing drivers
Sports car racing team owners